is a Japanese R&B singer who debuted as a musician in 2008 with the song "Because...," a collaboration with LGYankees. Since then, she has collaborated on a number of singles with R&B musicians. In 2011, she broke into the top 10 on the RIAJ Digital Track Chart with her two collaborations with the group Cliff Edge: "The Answer" from her second album Answer, as well as "Endless Tears" from the group's greatest hits album Best of Love.

Biography 
Nakamura's mother is of Spanish and Filipino origin, while her father is Japanese. She was surrounded by Western music when she grew up.

In October 2011, Nakamura switched labels from King Records to Pony Canyon's KnifeEdge, releasing her song "Never Let Me Go" as her first release.

Discography

Albums

Extended plays

Singles

Singles as lead artist

Singles as featured artist

Other appearances

References

External links 
Official Profile 
Official blog 

1991 births
Living people
Japanese women pop singers
Japanese rhythm and blues singers
Pony Canyon artists
Singers from Tokyo
Singers from Manila
21st-century Japanese women singers
21st-century Japanese singers